Dimitris Ioannou (born 15 March 1977) is a retired Greek football player.

References

External links
Insports profile 

1977 births
Living people
Greek expatriate footballers
Levadiakos F.C. players
A.O. Kerkyra players
Atromitos F.C. players
Apollon Pontou FC players
Iraklis Thessaloniki F.C. players
Panachaiki F.C. players
AEP Paphos FC players
Super League Greece players
Cypriot First Division players
Cypriot Second Division players
Association football defenders
Footballers from Athens
Greek footballers